Carnival of Chaos is Gwar's sixth studio album, released on March 25, 1997 by Metal Blade Records.

Overview
The album is Gwar's longest album (exceeding 74 minutes), and contains Stampe's solo number: "Don't Need a Man". Hunter Jackson also returns in "The Private Pain of Techno Destructo", and there is a ballad entitled "Sammy" about the rotting corpse of Sammy Davis Jr. "In Her Fear" is Oderus's swan song, and Beefcake the Mighty gives a memorable song in "Hate Love Songs" - Casey Orr's last song as a lead vocalist with the band until his return on Lust in Space.

Carnival of Chaos is the last Gwar album to feature Peter Lee as Flattus Maximus. Due to recurring stomach problems stemming from a gunshot wound sustained in a carjacking four years prior, he left the band shortly after the 1997 Halloween Tour.

"Don't Need A Man" was not originally meant to be a Gwar song. It was supposed to be just Danielle Stampe (Slymenstra Hymen) singing and Michael Derks (Balsac the Jaws of Death) on piano. It ended up featuring Brad Roberts (Jizmak Da Gusha), Derks (sequencing the upright bass part, the piano and the guitar) and Stampe. Derks produced the track, but received no credit. Additionally, Derks wrote "Hate Love Songs," and was initially going to sing the lead, but opted instead to have Orr (Beefcake) do it. He is still heard in the background.

Approximately nine minutes after "Don't Need A Man" is a clip of "Drop Drawers." This was supposed to appear on the album, along with a complete version of "The Private Pain of Techno Destructo." The latter had to be changed, due to Paramount's refusal to give permission to use music from the 1967 Star Trek episode, "Amok Time". There is a "Slave Pit Single, released after this album, that features it. The former, which included a cover of Billy Thorpe's "Children of the Sun," had to be cut, save for a short clip at the end. 

"Drop Drawers" can be found on Slaves Going Single, an extremely rare B-sides collection released between We Kill Everything and Violence Has Arrived on Slave Pit Records. The latter can be heard, minus the unlicensed cover, on the album just after Techno sings "You'll just make me...", and the full song (except for a slight cut-off of Techno at the end) on the Rawgwar Slave Pit Single.

"Sammy" is the longest song on this album, despite "Don't Need A Man"'s 12:40 track length (most of it is silence; the actual song is a little less than 4:30 long). Clocking in at 6:57, it and the title track from their 1999 follow-up, We Kill Everything, were the longest songs by the band until the song "War on GWAR" (7:21) was released on 2017's The Blood of Gods. Note, the 30th anniversary remix of Scumdogs of the Universe includes the entire version of “King Queen”, which clocks in at 8:09, making it the longest Gwar song to appear on a studio album. 

Songs from Carnival have not been in the band's setlists for a number of years except for the group occasionally playing "Penguin Attack" and "Back to Iraq". Unlike We Kill Everything, where the band readily admits their dissatisfaction for the content (explaining the absence of songs from that album), they have yet to give a definitive reason why. The songs "Pre-Skool Prostitute" and "Hate Love Songs" were part of Gwar's 2013 Madness At The Core Of Time Tour setlist.

Track listing
All tracks by Gwar

Personnel 

 Dave Brockie (Oderus Urungus) - Lead vocals
 Pete Lee (Flattus Maximus) – Lead guitar, backing vocals
 Mike Derks (Balsac the Jaws of Death) – Rhythm guitar, backing vocals
 Casey Orr (Beefcake the Mighty) – Bass, backing vocals, lead vocals on "Hate Love Songs"
 Brad Roberts (Jizmak Da Gusha) - Drums
 Hunter Jackson (Techno Destructo) - Lead vocals on "The Private Pain of Techno Destructo"
 Danielle Stampe (Slymenstra Hymen) – Lead vocals on "Don't Need a Man"
 Ron Goudie – Producer, Mixing
 Warren Croyle – Mixing
 Gene Grimaldi – Mastering
 Katherine Leatherwood – Photography
 Drew Mazurek – Mixing
 Mark Miley – Assistant Engineer, Drum Producer
 Grant Rutledge – Assistant Engineer
 Eddy Schreyer – Mastering

References

1997 albums
Gwar albums
Metal Blade Records albums